The British School of Ulaanbaatar (BSU) is a private international day school founded in 2012 and is located in the Khan Uul District of Ulaanbaatar, Mongolia. Its aim and vision statement is to provide 'an education for the world'. The School offers an educational programme based on the National Curriculum of England and Wales and prepares students to sit the IGCSE and A-Level qualifications provided by Cambridge Assessment International Examinations (CAIE) .  After graduation, most of the students attend universities in North America, Europe and Australia. BSU is a Patron's Accredited member of COBIS.

Curriculum 
BSU offers an academic programme that prepares students to sit IGCSE and A-Level qualifications, provided by CAIE, at 16 and 18, respectively.  Additionally, the Mongolian Diploma programme is also offered as an option to students in Years 12 and 13 who wish to gain entrance to universities in Mongolia. Academic subjects taught at the School are English (Literature and Language), Mathematics, Biology, Chemistry, Physics, History, Geography, Economics, Business Studies, Art, Design, Physical Education, Music, Mandarin Chinese, Mongolian Language and Mongolian History and Culture.  All lessons are taught in English except for modern languages and the Mongolian History and Culture classes. English as an Additional Language (EAL) is provided for students who require support to develop their fluency in English, as are sessions for students with identified specific educational needs.

Composition and Operations 
Classes are provided for students from three to eighteen years of age and the School admits students of all nationalities who wish to study an international British curriculum in the medium of English. The School has grown from 190 students in 2012 to 570 by 2022. Class sizes are limited to no more than twenty-four students, and the majority of the teachers are British. The School has four day Houses named after the patron saints of the British Isles (St. George, St. Andrew, St. David and St. Patrick). Every student is a member of one of the Houses.  The School day runs from 08:00 to 16:00, with registration or assembly at the start of the day followed by lessons that begin at 08:30.  Lessons are split into periods of one hour. A range of optional extra-curricular activities (ECAs) are also offered each afternoon, providing students to participate in academic groups, preparation programmes for national and international competitions, creative and performing arts clubs and team sports.

External links

 PENTA Inspection Report of BSU

Schools in Mongolia